Rose position is a position in which a patient is placed while undergoing a tonsillectomy, adenoidectomy or uvulopalatopharyngoplasty.

Position
In this position both the head and neck are extended. This is done by keeping a sand bag under the supine patient's shoulder blade. For a patient with a kyphosis or a stiff neck, the head piece of the table is raised so that the head ring really does support the head. Its contraindicated in patients with Down syndrome owing to atlanto-axial instability.

History
This position owes its name to a staff nurse named Rose who suggested this position to the surgeon.

References

Medical procedures